Kolu or KOLU may refer to:

Places 
Kolu, Harju County, village in Kose Parish, Harju County, Estonia
Kolu kõrts, an inn originally located in that village and currently exhibited as a part of the Estonian Open Air Museum.
Kolu, Lääne County, village in Ridala Parish, Lääne County, Estonia
Kolu, Lääne-Viru County, village in Kadrina Parish, Lääne-Viru County, Estonia
Kolu, Järva County, village in Türi Parish, Järva County, Estonia
Kolu, Hormozgan, a village in Hormozgan Province, Iran
Kolu-ye Olya, a village in Ardabil Province, Iran
Kolu-ye Sofla, a village in Ardabil Province, Iran

Other uses 
Kolu may be an alternate spelling of Golu, a toy festival celebrated during the festival of Navratri
KOLU, an American radio station
Columbus Municipal Airport (Nebraska) (ICAO code: KOLU), an airport in the US

See also
Kalow (disambiguation)
Kalu (disambiguation)